"One Man Woman" is a song by American R&B/soul singer Milira. Released on May 16, 1992, it was the lead single from her studio album, Back Again!!!.

Track listing
US CD single.

Charts

References

1992 singles
Milira songs
Songs written by Narada Michael Walden
Song recordings produced by Narada Michael Walden
1992 songs
Songs written by Jeffrey E. Cohen
Motown singles